The Walton County Heritage Museum is located at 1140 Circle Drive, DeFuniak Springs, Florida. Housed in the former L&N railroad depot, it is part of the DeFuniak Springs Historic District, which is listed on the National Register of Historic Places.

Footnotes

Defuniak Springs, Florida (Images of America Series) by Diane Merkel

External links

 Walton County Heritage Museum

Museums in Walton County, Florida
Historical society museums in Florida
Historic district contributing properties in Florida
National Register of Historic Places in Walton County, Florida
Former railway stations in Florida
DeFuniak Springs
Transportation buildings and structures in Walton County, Florida